is a former Japanese football player.

Playing career
Takayama was born in Yamanashi Prefecture on November 26, 1979. After graduating from high school, he joined Japan Football League club Ventforet Kofu based in his local in 1998. The club was promoted to new league J2 League from 1999. On May 2, 1999, he debuted as substitute midfielder from the 87th minute against Consadole Sapporo. However he could only play this match until 2000. In 2001, he moved to Prefectural Leagues club Gunma FC Horikoshi. The club was promoted to Regional Leagues from 2002. He retired end of 2003 season.

Club statistics

References

External links

1979 births
Living people
Association football people from Yamanashi Prefecture
Japanese footballers
J2 League players
Japan Football League (1992–1998) players
Ventforet Kofu players
Arte Takasaki players
Association football midfielders